The Ufag 60.03, prototype for proposed production as the Ufag C.II, was a reconnaissance aircraft of the Austro-Hungarian air forces (Luftstreitskrafte), in the First World War. The C.II fared well in the 1918 C-class trials and production was planned but abandoned with the armistice in November 1918. The sole Ufag 60.03 was offered for sale to the Czecho-Slovakian government in 1920.

Specifications (60.03)

References

C.II
1910s Austro-Hungarian military reconnaissance aircraft
Biplanes
Single-engined tractor aircraft